Chichawatni railway station (Urdu and )  is located in Chichawatni city, Sahiwal district of Punjab province of the Pakistan.

Gallery

See also
 List of railway stations in Pakistan
 Pakistan Railways

References

External links

Railway stations in Sahiwal District
Railway stations on Karachi–Peshawar Line (ML 1)